Sarwan Singh Phillaur is an Indian politician. He was Minister for Jails, Tourism, Cultural Affairs and Printing and Stationery in the present Punjab Government.

Political career
He was elected to the Punjab Legislative Assembly in 1977 on an Akali Dal ticket from  Phillaur for first time. He was re-elected from Phillaur in 1980, 1985, 1997 and 2007. In 2012, he successfully contested from Kartarpur. Presently he is cabinet minister and holding portfolio of Jails, Tourism, Cultural Affairs and Printing and Stationery. In 1997, he was Minister for Welfare of Scheduled Castes and Backward Classes.

References

Punjabi people
Shiromani Akali Dal politicians
State cabinet ministers of Punjab, India
Punjab, India MLAs 2007–2012
Place of birth missing (living people)
Living people
Indian Sikhs
Year of birth missing (living people)
Punjab, India MLAs 2012–2017
Punjab, India MLAs 1977–1980
Punjab, India MLAs 1980–1985
Punjab, India MLAs 1985–1990
Punjab, India MLAs 1997–2002
People from Jalandhar district